Senecio vaginatus, the smooth ragwort, is a species of flowering plant in the aster family. It is endemic to the Falkland Islands. Its natural habitats are temperate shrubland, rocky shores and other rocky areas. It is threatened by habitat loss.

References

vaginatus
Flora of the Falkland Islands
Least concern plants
Taxonomy articles created by Polbot